Wang Shipeng, (born April 6, 1983 in Dandong, Liaoning) (nickname: Wang 7 王七)is a former professional basketball player from the People's Republic of China. At a height of 1.98 m (6'6"), and a weight of 96 kg (212 pounds), he played mainly at the shooting guard position, but he could also play as a small forward.

Professional career
Wang played for the Guangdong Southern Tigers, a Chinese Basketball Association (CBA) team based in Guangzhou. Wang was the Chinese Basketball Association's Finals MVP in 2011.

National team career
Wang was a primary 3 point shooter (along with Fangyu Zhu) in the Chinese National Team. Wang made a 3-point shot at the buzzer, which helped China beat Slovenia 78–77, in the last game of group D, in the 2006 FIBA World Championship. China advanced to the tournament's final 16 with the win. He also competed at the 2008 Summer Olympics and at the 2012 Summer Olympics.

References

External links
 china.org Profile
 Wang Shipeng 3 Point Game-Winning Shot Versus Slovenia

1983 births
Living people
Basketball players at the 2008 Summer Olympics
Basketball players at the 2012 Summer Olympics
Chinese men's basketball players
Guangdong Southern Tigers players
Olympic basketball players of China
Sportspeople from Dandong
Shooting guards
Small forwards
Basketball players from Liaoning
Asian Games medalists in basketball
Basketball players at the 2006 Asian Games
Basketball players at the 2010 Asian Games
Asian Games gold medalists for China
Medalists at the 2006 Asian Games
Medalists at the 2010 Asian Games
2010 FIBA World Championship players
2006 FIBA World Championship players